This is a list of all tornadoes that were confirmed by local offices of the National Weather Service in the United States from November to December 2015.

United States yearly total

November

November 1 event

November 2 event

November 5 event

November 6 event

November 11 event

November 15 event

November 16 event

November 17 event

November 18 event

December

December 10 event

December 12 event

December 21 event

December 23 event

December 24 event

December 25 event

December 26 event

December 27 event

December 28 event

See also
Tornadoes of 2015
List of United States tornadoes from September to October 2015

Notes

References

United States
Tornadoes
2015-11
Tornadoes,11
Tornadoes
Tornadoes